Chalarus is a genus of flies belonging to the family Pipunculidae.

The genus has cosmopolitan distribution.

Species
Chalarus absonus Rafael, 1990
Chalarus amazonensis Rafael, 1988
Chalarus angustifrons Morakote, 1990
Chalarus argenteus Coe, 1966
Chalarus basalis Loew, 1873
Chalarus beijingensis Yang & Xu, 1998
Chalarus brevicaudis Jervis, 1992
Chalarus chilensis Collin, 1931
Chalarus clarus Jervis, 1992
Chalarus connexus Rafael, 1988
Chalarus decorus Jervis, 1992
Chalarus delicatus Rafael, 1990
Chalarus elegantulus Jervis, 1992
Chalarus exiguus (Haliday, 1833)
Chalarus fimbriatus Coe, 1966
Chalarus flosculus Morakote, 1990
Chalarus griseus Coe, 1966
Chalarus gynocephalus Jervis, 1992
Chalarus holosericeus (Meigen, 1824)
Chalarus immanus Kehlmaier, 2008
Chalarus indistinctus Jervis, 1992
Chalarus irwini Skevington & Kehlmaier, 2008
Chalarus juliae Jervis, 1992
Chalarus latifrons Hardy, 1943
Chalarus lenkoi Rafael, 1990
Chalarus leticiae Kehlmaier, 2003
Chalarus longicaudis Jervis, 1992
Chalarus magnalus Morakote, 1990
Chalarus marki Kehlmaier, 2008
Chalarus orientalis Jervis, 1985
Chalarus parmenteri Coe, 1966
Chalarus perplexus Jervis, 1992
Chalarus polychaetus Huo & Yang, 2011
Chalarus proprius Jervis, 1992
Chalarus pughi Coe, 1966
Chalarus rectifrons Morakote, 1990
Chalarus saxonicus Kehlmaier, 2008
Chalarus spurius (Fallén, 1816)
Chalarus trilineatus Jervis, 1985
Chalarus triramosus Rafael, 1990
Chalarus unilacertus Morakote, 1990
Chalarus velutinus (Cresson, 1911)
Chalarus xanthopodus Rafael, 1990
Chalarus zanganus Yang & Xu, 1987
Chalarus zlobini Kuznetzov, 1990
Chalarus zyginae Jervis, 1992

References

Pipunculidae
Brachycera genera
Diptera of Europe
Diptera of Asia
Diptera of North America
Diptera of South America
Taxa named by Francis Walker (entomologist)